Francis Myers may refer to:

 Francis J. Myers (1901–1956), American politician from Pennsylvania
 Francis Kerschner Myers (1874–1940), United States federal judge
 Francis Myers (fl. 1854), California pioneer and designer of the Casa Grande house in New Almaden, San Jose, California

See also
Frank Myers (disambiguation)
Frances Myers (disambiguation)